Corner Glacier is a steep glacier descending Deep Freeze Range between Black Ridge and Mount Dickason to merge with the confluent ice of Nansen Ice Sheet, in Victoria Land. It was first explored by the Northern Party of the British Antarctic Expedition, 1910–13, and so named by them because of its location with respect to the Nansen Ice Sheet.

References
 

Glaciers of Scott Coast